Clinton Roets is a South African international lawn bowler.

Roets won the bronze medal in the fours with Billy Radloff and Brian Dixon and Wayne Perry at the 2008 World Outdoor Bowls Championship in Christchurch.

In 2007 he won the fours gold medal at the Atlantic Bowls Championships and in 2011 he won the triples bronze medal at the Atlantic Bowls Championships.

He won a silver medal in the Men's Fours at the 2012 World Outdoor Bowls Championship in Adelaide.

References

Living people
South African male bowls players
Year of birth missing (living people)